Verrucosa is a genus of orb-weaver spiders first described by Henry McCook in 1888. It contains almost fifty described species, most of which live in South America. The only species in the United States is the arrowhead spider.

Species

 it contains forty-five species:
Verrucosa alvarengai Lise, Kesster & Silva, 2015 – Brazil
Verrucosa apuela Lise, Kesster & Silva, 2015 – Ecuador
Verrucosa arenata (Walckenaer, 1841) (type) – USA to Panama, Greater Antilles
Verrucosa avilesae Lise, Kesster & Silva, 2015 – Ecuador, Colombia
Verrucosa bartica Lise, Kesster & Silva, 2015 – Guyana
Verrucosa benavidesae Lise, Kesster & Silva, 2015 – Colombia, Peru
Verrucosa brachiscapa Lise, Kesster & Silva, 2015 – Ecuador
Verrucosa cachimbo Lise, Kesster & Silva, 2015 – Brazil
Verrucosa cajamarca Lise, Kesster & Silva, 2015 – Peru
Verrucosa caninde Lise, Kesster & Silva, 2015 – Brazil
Verrucosa canje Lise, Kesster & Silva, 2015 – Guyana
Verrucosa carara Lise, Kesster & Silva, 2015 – Costa Rica
Verrucosa chanchamayo Lise, Kesster & Silva, 2015 – Peru
Verrucosa coroico Lise, Kesster & Silva, 2015 – Bolivia
Verrucosa cuyabenoensis Lise, Kesster & Silva, 2015 – Ecuador, Bolivia
Verrucosa cuyuni Lise, Kesster & Silva, 2015 – Guyana
Verrucosa cylicophora (Badcock, 1932) – Brazil, Paraguay
Verrucosa excavata Lise, Kesster & Silva, 2015 – Colombia
Verrucosa florezi Lise, Kesster & Silva, 2015 – Colombia
Verrucosa galianoae Lise, Kesster & Silva, 2015 – Brazil
Verrucosa guatopo Lise, Kesster & Silva, 2015 – Venezuela
Verrucosa hoferi Lise, Kesster & Silva, 2015 – Brazil
Verrucosa lampra (Soares & Camargo, 1948) – Brazil
Verrucosa lata Lise, Kesster & Silva, 2015 – Brazil
Verrucosa latigastra Lise, Kesster & Silva, 2015 – Guyana, Brazil
Verrucosa levii Lise, Kesster & Silva, 2015 – Brazil
Verrucosa macarena Lise, Kesster & Silva, 2015 – Colombia
Verrucosa manauara Lise, Kesster & Silva, 2015 – Brazil
Verrucosa meridionalis (Keyserling, 1892) – Brazil, Argentina
Verrucosa meta Lise, Kesster & Silva, 2015 – Colombia
Verrucosa opon Lise, Kesster & Silva, 2015 – Colombia
Verrucosa pedrera Lise, Kesster & Silva, 2015 – Colombia
Verrucosa rancho Lise, Kesster & Silva, 2015 – Venezuela
Verrucosa reticulata (O. Pickard-Cambridge, 1889) – Panama
Verrucosa rhea Lise, Kesster & Silva, 2015 – Brazil
Verrucosa scapofracta Lise, Kesster & Silva, 2015 – Brazil, Argentina
Verrucosa septemmammata Caporiacco, 1954 – French Guiana
Verrucosa sergipana Lise, Kesster & Silva, 2015 – Brazil
Verrucosa silvae Lise, Kesster & Silva, 2015 – Colombia, Peru
Verrucosa simla Lise, Kesster & Silva, 2015 – Trinidad
Verrucosa suaita Lise, Kesster & Silva, 2015 – Colombia
Verrucosa tarapoa Lise, Kesster & Silva, 2015 – Ecuador, Colombia, Brazil
Verrucosa tuberculata Lise, Kesster & Silva, 2015 – Colombia
Verrucosa undecimvariolata (O. Pickard-Cambridge, 1889) – Mexico to Argentina
Verrucosa zebra (Keyserling, 1892) – Brazil, Argentina

Verrucosa furcifera (Keyserling, 1886) from Queensland, Australia was placed in this genus due to its strong outer similarity. However, it is considered misplaced, and is now Carepalxis furcifera.

References

External links

Araneidae
Araneomorphae genera
Spiders of North America
Spiders of South America